Negayan is a genus of South American anyphaenid sac spiders first described by M. J. Ramírez in 2003.

Species
 it contains twelve species:
Negayan ancha Lopardo, 2005 – Chile, Argentina
Negayan argentina Lopardo, 2005 – Argentina
Negayan cerronegro Lopardo, 2005 – Argentina
Negayan coccinea (Mello-Leitão, 1943) – Argentina
Negayan enrollada Lopardo, 2005 – Chile, Argentina
Negayan excepta (Tullgren, 1901) – Chile, Argentina
Negayan paduana (Karsch, 1880) – Chile, Argentina, Falkland Is.
Negayan puno Lopardo, 2005 – Peru, Argentina
Negayan tarapaca Lopardo, 2005 – Peru, Chile
Negayan tata Lopardo, 2005 – Chile, Argentina
Negayan tridentata (Simon, 1886) – Argentina
Negayan tucuman Lopardo, 2005 – Argentina

References

Anyphaenidae
Araneomorphae genera
Spiders of South America